Crimes of Passion (Chinese: 一場風花雪月的事) is a 2013 Chinese romance film directed by Gao Qunshu. It is a remake of the 1997 smash-hit TV series A Sentimental Story.

Cast
 Angelababy as Yueyue
 Jae Hee as Jeong-hee
 Huang Xiaoming as Xue Yu
 Wei Zi
 Su Qing
 Cao Wei-Yu
 Meng Tingyi as 小马

References

2013 films
Chinese romance films
Chinese crime films
2013 romance films
Films directed by Gao Qunshu
2010s Mandarin-language films